The New Dance Show is a television series in Detroit, Michigan, which ran on WGPR-TV 62 (now a CBS affiliate known as WWJ-TV) and W68CH 68 (now WHPS-CD 15). Hosted by R.J. Watkins, The New Dance Show was a local version of Soul Train and featured regular dancers, including a man who dressed like a Gypsy and who wore a cape, and a woman who dressed as a boxer. The show featured music from several influential Detroit techno artists.

The New Dance Show was developed as a spin-off of The Scene, which ran from October 1975 to December 1987. The New Dance Show debuted in 1988, the first show being recorded at Reggie's Moulin Rouge in Detroit. Production later moved to Highland Park in 1994 after R.J. Watkins' purchase of WHPR-FM. The New Dance Show briefly ended production shortly afterward after WGPR was sold and Watkins signed on his W68CH as a sister station to WHPR, which would resume production of The New Dance Show for two additional years. Reruns currently air on the now-WHPS-CD at various evening timeslots.

References/External Media

External links

Dance television shows
Culture of Detroit
1988 American television series debuts
1996 American television series endings
Local music television shows in the United States